Rhododendron javanicum is a rhododendron species native to Indonesia, Malaysia, and the Philippines. Plants may be terrestrial or epiphytic. Some forms from the Philippines may have red or bicoloured flowers, but are less often seen in cultivation.

Subspecies
Nine subspecies are recognized:
 Rhododendron javanicum subsp. brookeanum (H.Low ex Lindl.) Argent & Phillipps – epiphytic shrub or tree, Borneo
 Rhododendron javanicum subsp. cladotrichum (Sleumer) Argent – epiphytic shrub, Borneo (Sabah and east-central Kalimantan)
 Rhododendron javanicum subsp. gracile (H.Low ex Lindl.) Argent, A.Lamb & Phillipps – epiphytic shrub, Borneo
 Rhododendron javanicum subsp. javanicum – hemiepiphytic shrub or small tree, Sumatra, Java, Borneo, and the Lesser Sunda Islands 
 Rhododendron javanicum subsp. kinabaluense (Argent, A.Lamb & Phillipps) Argent – hemiepiphytic shrub, Borneo (Sabah)
 Rhododendron javanicum subsp. moultonii (Ridl.) Argent – epiphytic shrub, Sabah and Sarawak
 Rhododendron javanicum subsp. palawanense Argent – epiphytic shrub, Philippines (Palawan)
 Rhododendron javanicum subsp. schadenbergii (Warb.) Argent – epiphytic shrub, Philippines and northeastern Sulawesi
 Rhododendron javanicum subsp. teysmannii (Miq.) Argent – epiphytic shrub, Peninsular Malaysia, Sumatra, Java, and Lesser Sunda Islands

References

External links

 Vireya.net
 Hirsutum.com

javanicum
Flora of Malesia